Lat Phrao station is a Bangkok MRT station on the Blue Line located under Ratchadaphisek Road, near Lat Phrao Road. Although the station's name is Lat Phrao, it isn't located in Lat Phrao District and Central Plaza Lat Phrao is nearer to Phahon Yothin. Its symbol color is  light blue., it can be transferred to MRT Yellow Line at Lat Phrao station in the future.

References 

MRT (Bangkok) stations
Railway stations opened in 2004
2004 establishments in Thailand